Vjačeslavs Ževnerovičs (born 18 August 1967) is a retired football striker from Latvia. He twice became top scorer of the highest league in Latvia, the Virsliga: in 1991 and 1992. He obtained one cap for the Latvia national football team, playing Lithuania on 12 July 1992 at the Baltic Cup 1992 in Liepāja.

Honours
Virsliga Top Scorer (2):
 1991, 1992

References

 

1967 births
Living people
Latvian footballers
Latvian expatriate footballers
Latvia international footballers
Latvian Higher League players
Expatriate footballers in Finland
Latvian expatriate sportspeople in Finland
Association football forwards